The 2017–18 season was Mezőkövesdi SE's 3rd competitive season, 2nd consecutive season in the OTP Bank Liga and 42nd year in existence as a football club.

First team squad

Transfers

Summer

In:

Out:

Winter

In:

Out:

Statistics

Appearances and goals
Last updated on 28 April 2018.

|-
|colspan="14"|Youth players:

|-
|colspan="14"|Out to loan:

|-
|colspan="14"|Players no longer at the club:

|}

Top scorers
Includes all competitive matches. The list is sorted by shirt number when total goals are equal.

Last updated on 28 April 2018

Disciplinary record
Includes all competitive matches. Players with 1 card or more included only.

Last updated on 28 April 2018.

Overall
{|class="wikitable"
|-
|Games played || 30 (28 OTP Bank Liga and 2 Hungarian Cup)
|-
|Games won || 7 (6 OTP Bank Liga and 1 Hungarian Cup)
|-
|Games drawn || 10 (10 OTP Bank Liga and 0 Hungarian Cup)
|-
|Games lost || 13 (12 OTP Bank Liga and 1 Hungarian Cup)
|-
|Goals scored || 36
|-
|Goals conceded || 52
|-
|Goal difference || -16
|-
|Yellow cards || 80
|-
|Red cards || 2
|-
|rowspan="1"|Worst discipline ||  Dávid Hudák (12 , 0 )
|-
|rowspan="1"|Best result || 4–1 (A) v Kecskemét - Hungarian Cup - 20-09-2017
|-
|rowspan="1"|Worst result || 0–5 (A) v Ferencváros - OTP Bank Liga - 30-07-2017
|-
|rowspan="1"|Most appearances ||  Tamás Cseri (29 appearances)
|-
|rowspan="1"|Top scorer ||  Márk Koszta (9 goals)
|-
|Points || 31/90 (34.44%)
|-

Nemzeti Bajnokság I

Matches

League table

Results summary

Results by round

Hungarian Cup

References

External links
 Official Website
 UEFA
 fixtures and results

Mezőkövesdi SE seasons
Mezokovesd se